
NVC community CG10 (Festuca ovina - Agrostis capillaris - Thymus praecox grassland) is one of the calcicolous grassland communities in the British National Vegetation Classification system. Of the upland group of calcicolous grasslands, it is the only one with a short sward associated with heavy grazing.

It is a comparatively widely distributed community in the British uplands. There are three subcommunities.

Community composition

The following constant species are found in this community:
 Common Bent (Agrostis capillaris)
 Harebell (Campanula rotundifolia)
 Sheep's Fescue (Festuca ovina)
 Red Fescue (Festuca rubra)
 Ribwort Plantain (Plantago lanceolata)
 Tormentil (Potentilla erecta)
 Self-heal (Prunella vulgaris)
 Wild Thyme (Thymus praecox) 
 Common Dog-violet (Viola riviniana)
 Glittering Wood-moss (Hylocomium splendens)

The following rare species are also associated with the community:

 the Lady's-mantle (Alchemilla filicaulis ssp. filicaulis)
 the Lady's-mantle (Alchemilla wichurae)
 Hair Sedge (Carex capillaris)
 Soft-leaved Sedge (Carex montana)
 Rock Sedge (Carex rupestris)
 Hoary Whitlowgrass (Draba incana)
 Limestone Bedstraw (Galium sterneri)
 Spring Sandwort (Minuartia verna)
 Alpine Forget-me-not (Myosotis alpestris)
 Dwarf Cudweed (Omalotheca supina)
 Alpine Pearlwort (Sagina saginoides)
 Dwarf Willow (Salix herbacea)
 Sibbaldia (Sibbaldia procumbens)
 Scottish Asphodel (Tofieldia pusilla)

Distribution

This community is found widely on calcareous upland sites in Scotland, northern England and Wales.

Subcommunities

There are three subcommunities:
 the Trifolium repens - Luzula campestris subcommunity
 the Carex pulicaris - Carex panicea subcommunity
 the Saxifraga aizoides - Ditrichum flexicaule subcommunity

References

 Rodwell, J. S. (1992) British Plant Communities Volume 3 - Grasslands and montane communities  (hardback),  (paperback)

CG10